was a town located in Maniwa District, Okayama Prefecture, Japan.

As of 2003, the village had an estimated population of 2,946 and a density of 48.15 persons per km2. The total area was 61.19 km2.

On March 31, 2005, Yatsuka, along with the town of Hokubō (from Jōbō District), and towns of Katsuyama, Kuse, Ochiai and Yubara, and the villages of Chūka, Kawakami and Mikamo (all from Maniwa District) were merged to create the city of Maniwa.

Geography
Mountains: 
Rivers: Asahi River (The big-3 river through Okayama Prefecture)

Adjoining municipalities
Okayama Prefecture
Yubara
Kawakami
Chūka
Tottori Prefecture
Kurayoshi (Former Sekigane town)

Economy

Agriculture
Dairy (Jersey cattle, milk)

Education
Yatsuka Elementary School
Hiruzen Junior High School
Okayama Prefectural Hiruzen High School

Transportation 
Expressways:
Yonago Expressway
Hiruzen Interchange (Kawakami)
National highways:
Route 313
Route 482
Prefectural roads:
Okayama Prefectural Route 324 (Higashikayabe-Shimofukuda)
Okayama Prefectural Route 325 (Bessho-Shimonagata)
Okayama Prefectural Route 422 (Hiruzen Kōgen)
Okayama Prefectural Route 702 (Yatsuka-Kawakami cycling road)
Roadside Station
Hiruzen Kōgen

Notable places and events
Mount Hiruzen

Hiruzen Jersey Land
Kamihiruzen Ski resort

External links
Official website of Maniwa in Japanese

Dissolved municipalities of Okayama Prefecture
Maniwa